Karklėnai  (Samogitian: Karklienā)  is a small town in Šiauliai County in northern-central Lithuania. In 2011 it had a population of 285.

References

This article was initially translated from the Lithuanian Wikipedia.

Towns in Šiauliai County
Duchy of Samogitia
Rossiyensky Uyezd
Kelmė District Municipality